GL Trade was a French provider of financial order management and trading systems that covered front office, middle office and back office used by international financial institutions.  Its main products were real-time market data and trading systems (servers and front end applications); a major part of its success was the GL NET private network linking up exchanges all over the world with thousands of brokers and traders. The company was purchased by SunGard in 2009 and the system was renamed as SunGard Global Trading.

History
GL Trade was established in 1987. Due to the company's founders Pierre Gatignol  and Louis-Christophe Laurent the acronym GL has been instantiated. In 2009 the company was acquired by US based SunGard, one of the world’s leading software and technology services companies.
The GL Trade shares were distributed as follows: NYSE Euronext owned approx. 40%, in the hand of the founders were 25,4% and 36,6% of the shares were free floating.

In May 2008 SunGard announced to acquire GL Trade by purchasing 65% in a first tranche for USD 625 Million, including effect of outstanding stock options.

In accordance to the AMF General Regulation, Paris-based Oddo Corporate Finance launched on SunGard's behalf an all-cash tender offer for the remainder of GL Trade's share capital at the original price of EUR 41.70 per share. The price per share did not reflect the overall decay of worldwide corporate's values according to the 2008 Financial Crisis impact. Thus the total deal value of nearly USD 1 Billion was considered to be financially hazardous, given the mere fact that GL Trade reported revenues of EUR 203 Million and an EBITDA of EUR 26 Million (fiscal year 2007).

References

Financial services companies of France
2008 mergers and acquisitions